Hans Jakob may refer to: 
 Hans Jakob (football player) (1908–1994), German football player
 Hans Jakob (Esperantist) (1891–1967), German-born Swiss Esperantist